Venedikt Petrovich Dzhelepov (April 12, 1913 in Moscow – March 12, 1999) was a Soviet physicist.

Biography 
He educated at Leningrad Industrial Institute. A couple of years upon graduation in 1937 he began in 1939 working with I. V. Kurchatov on the first in Europe cyclotron in the Radium Institute. The joint researches with Kurchatov determined Dzhelepov's entire further career.   

In August 1943, Dzhelepov joined the group of the first staff members of Laboratory No. 2 which is now known as the Kurchatov Atomic Energy Institute for solving uranium problem. In 1948 Dzhelepov was given by Kurchatov a new task as deputy director of the new Laboratory being developed in Dubna (later became the Institute for Nuclear Problems within the USSR Academy of Sciences (he held this position in 1948-1956). 

Later he was appointed the Director of Laboratory for Nuclear Problems at Joint Institute for Nuclear Research in Dubna (1956-1988). Since 1989 worked as its Honorary Director.

Awards 
 Stalin Prize (twice 1951 and 1953)
 Order of Lenin (1951)
 Order of the October Revolution (1983)
 Order of the Red Banner of Labour (twice 1962 and 1974)
 Order of Friendship (1996)
 Kurchatov Gold Medal (1986)

Memory 

 Laboratory of Nuclear Problems of Joint Institute for Nuclear Research (JINR) created by Venedikt Dzhelepov now bears his name
 In Dubna there is a monument established showing the outdoor meeting of Dzhelepov and Bruno Pontecorvo
 One of the Dubna streets is named after Dzherelov

Notes 

1913 births
1999 deaths
20th-century Russian physicists
Scientists from Moscow
Communist Party of the Soviet Union members

Corresponding Members of the Russian Academy of Sciences
Corresponding Members of the USSR Academy of Sciences
Peter the Great St. Petersburg Polytechnic University alumni
Officers of the Order of Merit of the Republic of Poland
Stalin Prize winners
Recipients of the Medal of Zhukov
Recipients of the Order of Lenin
Recipients of the Order of the Red Banner of Labour
Russian physicists
Soviet military personnel of the Winter War
Soviet physicists